Biotechnology Society of Nepal (BSN) is an apolitical, non-government, non-profit organization motivated for promotion of Biotechnology in Nepal and beyond.

Objectives

 To introduce, promote and propagate the use of biotechnology by encouraging basic and applied research and disseminating their results for sustainable development of the populace.
 To garner, compile and disseminate the information related to biotechnology in Nepal.
 To publish books, journals, memoirs and reports based on biotechnology
 To bring collaboration and cooperation between scientific societies and academic institutions of the country with international societies for promotion of interaction among research workers within and outside the country.
  To procure and manage funds and grants for the promotion of research and development of biotechnology.
 To study on physical and biological resources in Nepal and to develop suitable technological adroitness for their extraction and utilization.
  To develop a platform for integration of all students, research workers, scientists, academicians, entrepreneurs, policy makers, university biology teaching faculties and others interested in biotechnology for overall development of the country.

Publications
Biotechnology Society of Nepal publishes the Nepal Journal of Biotechnology as a scientific journal.

Founders
Mr. Saroj Ghimire, President (2007 to 2014)

Executive Board members
Mr. Nabin Narayan Munkarmi, President
Mr. Kushal Shrestha, Vice President
Mr. Dinesh Giri, Secretary
Ms. Nisha Kiran Shrestha, Treasurer
Mr. Binayak Raj Pandey, Executive Member
Ms. Samikshya Kandel, Executive Member
Mr. Puskar Thapa, Executive Member

References

External links
Official website

Biotechnology organizations
Biology societies
Scientific organisations based in Nepal
Organisations
Non-profit organisations based in Nepal
2007 establishments in Nepal
Scientific organizations established in 2007